Liophidium is a genus of snakes in the family Pseudoxyrhophiidae. The genus contains ten species, nine of which are endemic to the island of Madagascar and one to the island of Mayotte. All species of Liophidium are harmless to humans.

Species
The following species are recognized as being valid.

Liophidium apperti Domergue, 1984
Liophidium chabaudi Domergue, 1984 
Liophidium maintikibo Franzen, Jones, Raselimanana, Nagy, D’Cruze, Glaw & Vences, 2009
Liophidium mayottensis  (W. Peters, 1874)  - Peters' brightsnake
Liophidium pattoni Vieites, Ratsoavina, Randrianiaina, Nagy, Glaw &  Vences, 2010
Liophidium rhodogaster (Schlegel, 1837) - gold-collared snake
Liophidium therezieni Domergue, 1984
Liophidium torquatum (Boulenger, 1888)
Liophidium trilineatum Boulenger, 1896 - Madagascar three-lined snake
Liophidium vaillanti (Mocquard, 1901)

Nota bene: A binomial authority in parentheses indicates that the species was originally described in a genus other than Liophidium.

References

Further reading
Boulenger GA (1896). Catalogue of the Snakes in the British Museum (Natural History). Volume III., Containing the Colubridæ (Opisthoglyphæ and Proteroglyphæ), ... London: Trustees of the British Museum (Natural History). (Taylor and Francis, printers). xiv + 727 pp. + Plates I-XXV. (Liophidium, new genus, pp. 598–599).
Glaw F, Vences M (2007). A Field Guide to the Amphibians and Reptiles of Madagascar, Third Edition. Cologne, Germany: Vences & Glaw Verlag. 496 pp. .

Snakes of Africa
Reptiles of Madagascar
Snake genera
Taxa named by George Albert Boulenger
Pseudoxyrhophiidae